The MacBook Pro is a line of Mac laptops made by Apple Inc. Introduced in January 2006, it is the higher-end lineup in the MacBook family, sitting above the consumer-focused MacBook Air. It is currently sold with 13-inch, 14-inch, and 16-inch screens, all using Apple silicon M-series chips.

The original MacBook Pro used the design of the PowerBook G4, but replaced the PowerPC G4 chips with Intel Core processors, added a webcam, and introduced the MagSafe power connector. The 15-inch model was introduced in January 2006; the 17-inch model in April. Later revisions added Intel Core 2 Duo processors and LED-backlit displays.

The unibody model debuted in October 2008 in 13- and 15-inch variants, with a 17-inch variant added in January 2009. Called the "unibody" model because its case was machined from a single piece of aluminum, it had a thinner flush display, a redesigned trackpad whose entire surface consisted of a single clickable button, and a redesigned keyboard. Updates brought Intel Core i5 and i7 processors and introduced Intel's Thunderbolt.

The Retina MacBook Pro was released in 2012: the 15-inch in June, a 13-inch model in October. It is thinner than its predecessor, made solid-state storage (SSD) standard, added HDMI, and included a high-resolution Retina display. It eliminated Ethernet and FireWire ports and the optical drive.

The Touch Bar MacBook Pro, released in October 2016, adopted USB-C for all data ports and power and included a shallower "butterfly"-mechanism keyboard. On all but the base model, the function keys were replaced with a touchscreen strip called the Touch Bar with a Touch ID sensor integrated into the power button.

A November 2019 revision to the Touch Bar MacBook Pro introduced the Magic Keyboard, which uses a scissor-switch mechanism. The initial 16-inch model with a screen set in narrower bezels was followed by a 13-inch model in May 2020. This revision also modified the Touch Bar, as users were complaining about the ESC key disappearing and not being able to exit a computer window. Therefore, now it is put as a whole button as it was standard before Touch Bar Macs.

Another revision to the Touch Bar MacBook Pro was released in November 2020; it was the first MacBook Pro to feature an Apple-designed system on a chip, the Apple M1.

The 14-inch and 16-inch MacBook Pros were released in October 2021. Powered by either M1 Pro or M1 Max chips, they are the first to be available only with an Apple silicon system on a chip. These models re-introduced MagSafe, function keys, and some other elements that had been removed from the Touch Bar MacBook Pro.

Alongside the redesigned M2 MacBook Air, Apple refreshed the 14- and 16-inch MacBook Pros with the Apple M2 chip. The model features the same chassis, albeit with changes to the system audio: speakers compatible with Spatial Audio and a headphone jack with support for high-impedance headphones.

Intel-based

Aluminum (2006-2008) 

The original MacBook Pro used the design of the PowerBook G4, but replaced the PowerPC G4 chips with Intel Core processors,  added a built-in iSight camera, and introduced the MagSafe power connector. The optical drive was shrunk to fit into the slimmer MacBook Pro; it runs slower than the optical drive in the PowerBook G4 and cannot write to dual-layer DVDs. The 15-inch model was introduced in January 2006; the 17-inch model in April. In 2007, the 15-inch model  added Intel Core 2 Duo processors, and LED-backlit displays, and 17-inch did in 2008. The 2007 revision received new Nvidia Geforce 8600M GT video cards and the 2008 revision upgraded the processors to "Penryn" cores while adding multi-touch capabilities to the trackpad.

Both the original 15- and 17-inch model MacBook Pro computers come with ExpressCard/34 slots, which replace the PC Card slots found in the PowerBook G4. Initial first-generation 15-inch models retain the two USB 2.0 ports and a FireWire 400 port but drop the FireWire 800, until it was readded in a later revision. The 17-inch models have  an additional USB 2.0 port, as well as the FireWire 800 port missing from the initial 15-inch models. All models now included 802.11a/b/g. Later models include support for the draft 2.0 specification of 802.11n and Bluetooth 2.1.

The original case design was discontinued on October 14, 2008, for the 15-inch, and January 6, 2009, for the 17-inch.

Models of the MacBook Pro built from 2007 to early 2008 (15") / late 2008 (17") using the Nvidia 8600M GT chip reportedly exhibited failures in which the GPU die would detach from the chip carrier, or the chip would detach from the logic board. Apple initially ignored reports, before admitting to the fault and replacing logic boards free of charge for up to 4 years after the purchase date. NVIDIA also confirmed the issue, and previously manufactured replacement GPUs, which some users have replaced themselves.

Unibody (2008–2012) 

On October 14, 2008, in a press event at company headquarters, Apple officials announced a new 15-inch MacBook Pro featuring a "precision aluminum unibody enclosure" and tapered sides similar to those of the MacBook Air. Designers shifted the MacBook Pro's ports to the left side of the case, and moved the optical disc drive slot from the front to the right side, similar to the MacBook. The new MacBook Pro computers had two video cards that the user could switch between: the Nvidia GeForce 9600M GT with either 256 or 512 MB of dedicated memory and a GeForce 9400M with 256 MB of shared system memory. The FireWire 400 port was removed. The DVI port was replaced with a Mini DisplayPort receptacle. The original unibody MacBook Pro came with a user-removable battery; Apple claimed five hours of use, with one reviewer reporting results closer to four hours on a continuous video battery stress test. Apple said that the battery would hold 80% of its charge after 300 recharges.

The unibody-construction MacBook Pro largely follows the styling of the original aluminum iMac and the MacBook Air and is slightly thinner than its predecessor, albeit wider and deeper due to the widescreen display. The screen is high-gloss, covered by an edge-to-edge reflective glass finish, while an anti-glare matte option is available in the 15- and 17-inch models in which the glass panel is removed. The entire trackpad is usable and acts as a clickable button. The trackpad is also larger than that of the aluminum models, giving more room for scrolling and multi-touch gestures. When the line was updated in April 2010, inertial scrolling was added, making the scrolling experience much like that of the iPhone and iPad. The keys, which are still backlit, are now identical to those of Apple's now-standard sunken keyboard with separated black keys. The physical screen release latch from the aluminum models is replaced with a magnetic one.

During the MacWorld Expo keynote on January 6, 2009, Phil Schiller announced a 17-inch MacBook Pro with unibody construction. This version diverged from its 15-inch sibling with an anti-glare "matte" screen option (with the glossy finish standard) and a non user-removable lithium polymer battery. Instead of traditional round cells inside the casing, the lithium-ion polymer batteries are shaped and fitted into each notebook to maximally utilize space. Adaptive charging, which uses a chip to optimize the charge flow to reduce wear and tear, extends the battery's overall life. Battery life for the 17-inch version is quoted at eight hours, with 80 percent of this charge remaining after 1,000 charge-discharge cycles.

At Apple's Worldwide Developers Conference (WWDC) on June 8, 2009, it was announced that the 13-inch unibody MacBook would be upgraded and re-branded as a MacBook Pro, leaving only the white polycarbonate MacBook in the MacBook line. It was also announced that the entire MacBook Pro line would use the non-user-removable battery first introduced in the 17-inch MacBook Pro. The updated MacBook Pro 13- and the 15-inch would each have up to a claimed 7 hours of battery life, while the 17-inch would keep its 8-hour capacity. Some sources even reported up to eight hours of battery life for the 13- and 15-inch MacBook Pro computers during casual use, while others reported around six hours. Like the 17-inch MacBook Pro, Apple claims that they will last around 1,000 charging cycles while still containing 80% of their capacity. Graphics card options stayed the same from the previous release, although the 13-inch and the base model 15-inch, came with only the GeForce 9400M GPU. The screens were also improved, gaining a claimed 60 percent greater color gamut. All of these mid-2009 models also included a FireWire 800 port and all except the 17-inch models would receive an SD card slot. The 17-inch model would retain its ExpressCard/34 slot. For the 13-inch MacBook Pro, the Kensington lock slot was moved to the right side of the chassis. In August 2009, Apple extended the "matte" anti-glare display option to the 15-inch MacBook Pro.

On April 13, 2010, Intel Core i5 and Core i7 processors were introduced in the 15- and 17-inch models, while the 13-inch retained the Core 2 Duo with a speed increase. The power brick was redesigned and a high-resolution display (of ) was announced as an option for the 15-inch models. The 13-inch gained an integrated Nvidia GeForce 320M graphics chip with 256 MB of shared memory, while the 15- and 17-inch models were upgraded to the GeForce GT 330M, with either 256 or 512 MB of dedicated memory. The 15- and 17-inch models also have an integrated Intel GPU that is built into the Core i5 and i7 processors. The 15-inch model also gained . Save for a third USB 2.0 slot, all the ports on the 17-inch MacBook Pro are the same in type and number as on the 15-inch version. All models came with 4 GB of system memory that was upgradeable to 8 GB. Battery life was also extended further in this update, to an estimated 10 hours for the 13-inch and 8–9 hours on the 15- and 17-inch MacBook Pro computers. This was achieved through both greater power efficiency and adding more battery capacity. One reviewer reported about 6 hours of battery life through a continuous video battery stress test in the 15-inch and another, who called the battery life "unbeatable", reported nearer to 8 in the 13-inch through their "highly demanding battery drain test".

Thunderbolt technology, Sandy Bridge dual-core Intel Core i5 and i7 (on the 13-inch model) or quad-core i7 (on the 15- and 17-inch models) processors, and a high-definition FaceTime camera were added on February 24, 2011. Intel HD Graphics 3000 come integrated with the CPU, while the 15- and 17-inch models also utilize AMD Radeon HD 6490M and Radeon HD 6750M graphics cards. Later editions of these models, following the release of OS X Lion, replaced the Expose (F3) key with a Mission Control key, and the Dashboard (F4) key with a Launchpad key. The chassis bottoms are also engraved differently from the 2010 models. The Thunderbolt serial bus platform can achieve speeds of up to 10 Gbit/s, which is up to twice as fast as the USB 3.0 specification, 20 times faster than the USB 2.0 specification, and up to 12 times faster than FireWire 800. Apple says that Thunderbolt can be used to drive displays or to transfer large quantities of data in a short amount of time.

On June 11, 2012, Apple showcased its upgraded Mac notebooks, OS X Mountain Lion, and iOS 6 at the Worldwide Developers Conference (WWDC) in San Francisco. The new MacBook Pro models were updated with Ivy Bridge processors and USB 3.0 ports, and the default RAM on premium models was increased to 8 GB. Following this announcement, the 17-inch model was discontinued. After a media event on October 22, 2013, Apple discontinued all unibody MacBook Pros except for the entry-level 2.5 GHz 13-inch model. Apple discontinued the 13-inch aluminum MacBook Pro on October 27, 2016. Prior to its discontinuation it was Apple's only product to still include an optical drive and a FireWire port, and only notebook with a hard disk drive and Ethernet port. It is also the only MacBook Pro to support 9 versions of macOS, from Mac OS X Lion 10.7 through macOS Catalina 10.15.

Early and late 2011 models with a GPU; 15" & 17"; reportedly suffer from manufacturing problems leading to overheating, graphical problems, and eventually complete GPU and logic board failure. A similar but nonidentical problem affected iMac GPUs which were later recalled by Apple. The problem was covered by many articles in Mac-focused magazines, starting late 2013 throughout 2014. In August 2014 the law firm Whitfield Bryson & Mason LLP had begun investigating the problem to determine if any legal claim exists. On October 28, 2014, the firm announced that it has filed a class-action lawsuit in a California federal court against Apple. The lawsuit will cover residents residing in both California and Florida who have purchased a 2011 MacBook Pro notebook with an AMD graphics card. The firm is also investigating similar cases across the United States. On February 20, 2015, Apple instituted the  This "will repair affected MacBook Pro systems, free of charge". The program covered affected MacBook Pro models until December 31, 2016, or four years from original date of sale.

Retina (2012–2015) 

The Retina MacBook Pro was released in 2012, marketed as the "MacBook Pro with Retina display" to differentiate it from the previous model: the 15-inch in June 2012, a 13-inch model in October. It made solid-state storage (SSD) standard, upgraded to USB 3.0, added an additional Thunderbolt port, added HDMI, and included a high-resolution Retina display. The 15-inch model is 25% thinner than its predecessor. The model name is no longer placed at the bottom of the screen bezel; instead, it is found on the underside of the chassis, similar to an iOS device and is the first Macintosh notebook to not have its model name visible during normal use. It eliminated Ethernet, FireWire 800 ports, but Thunderbolt adapters were available for purchase, Kensington lock slot, the battery indicator button and light on the side of the chassis, and the optical drive, being the first professional notebook since the PowerBook 2400c,  but brought a new MagSafe port, dubbed the "MagSafe 2". Apple also claims improved speakers and microphones and a new system for cooling the notebook with improved fans.

The Retina models also have fewer user-accessible upgrade or replacement options than previous MacBooks. Unlike the unibody MacBook Pros, the memory is soldered onto the logic board and is therefore not upgradable. The solid state drive is not soldered and can be replaced by users, although it has a proprietary connector and form factor. The battery is glued into place; attempts to remove it may destroy the battery and/or trackpad. The entire case uses proprietary pentalobe screws and cannot be disassembled with standard tools. While the battery is glued in, recycling companies have stated that the design is only "mildly inconvenient" and does not hamper the recycling process.

The initial revision includes Intel's third-generation Core i7 processors (Ivy Bridge microarchitecture). Apple updated the line, on October 22, 2013, with Intel's Haswell processors and Iris Graphics, and 802.11ac Wi-Fi. The lower-end 15-inch model only included integrated graphics while the higher-end model continued to include a discrete Nvidia graphics card in addition to integrated graphics. Support for 4K video output via HDMI was added but limited the maximum number of external displays from three to two.

On March 9, 2015, the 13-inch model was updated with Intel Broadwell processors, Iris 6100 graphics, faster flash storage (based on PCIe 2.0 × 4 technology), faster RAM (upgraded from 1600MHZ to 1866MHZ), increased battery life (extended to 10 hours), and a Force Touch trackpad. On May 19, 2015, 15-inch model added Force Touch and changed the GPU to AMD Radeon R9 M370X, SSD based on PCIe 3.0 × 4 technology, the battery life was extended to 9 hours, and the rest of the configuration remained unchanged. The higher-end 15-inch model also added support for dual-cable output to  displays. The 15-inch models were released with the same Intel Haswell processors and Iris Pro graphics as the 2014 models due to a delay in shipment of newer Broadwell quad-core processors. 

Apple continued to sell the 2015 15-inch model until July 2018.

In June 2019, Apple announced a worldwide recall for certain 2015 15" MacBook Pro computers after receiving at least 26 reports of batteries becoming hot enough to produce smoke and inflict minor burns or property damage. The problem affected some 432,000 computers, mostly sold between September 2015 and February 2017. The company asked customers to stop using their computers until Apple could replace the batteries.

In September 2019, India's Directorate General of Civil Aviation said MacBook Pro computers could dangerously overheat, leading the national carrier Air India to ban the model on its flights.

Final models of the Retina MacBook Pro were unsupported with the release of macOS Ventura in 2022.

Touch Bar (2016–2020) 

Apple unveiled Touch Bar 13- and 15-inch MacBook Pro models during a press event at their headquarters on October 27, 2016. All models, except for the baseline 13-inch model, featured the Touch Bar, a new multi-touch-enabled OLED strip built into the top of the keyboard in place of the function keys. The Touch Bar is abutted on its right by a sapphire-glass button that doubles as a Touch ID sensor and a power button. The models also introduced a "second-generation" butterfly-mechanism keyboard whose keys have more travel than the first iteration in the Retina MacBook. The 13-inch model has a trackpad that is 46% larger than its predecessor while the 15-inch model has a trackpad twice as large as the Retina models.

All ports have been replaced with either two or four combination Thunderbolt 3 ports that support USB-C 3.1 Gen 2 and dual DisplayPort 1.2 signals, any of which can be used for charging. The MacBook Pro is incompatible with some older Thunderbolt 3-certified peripherals, including Intel's own reference design for Thunderbolt 3 devices. Furthermore, macOS on MacBook Pro blacklists (prevents from working) certain classes of Thunderbolt 3-compatible devices. Support for Thunderbolt 3 external graphics processing units (eGPU) was added in macOS High Sierra 10.13.4. Devices using HDMI, previous-generation Thunderbolt, and USB need an adapter to connect to the MacBook Pro. The models come with a 3.5 mm headphone jack; the TOSLINK functionality of previous MacBook Pro models has been removed.

Other updates to the MacBook Pro include dual- and quad-core Intel Skylake Core i5 and i7 processors, improved graphics, and displays that offer a 25% wider color gamut, 67% more brightness, and 67% more contrast. All versions can output to a 5K display; the 15-inch models can drive two such displays. The 15-inch models include a discrete Radeon Pro 450, 455 or 460 graphics card in addition to the integrated Intel graphics. The base 13-inch model has function keys instead of the Touch Bar, and just two USB-C ports. The flash storage in the Touch Bar models is soldered to the logic board and is not upgradeable, while in the 13-inch model without Touch Bar, it is removable, but difficult to replace, as it is a proprietary format of SSD storage.

On June 5, 2017, Apple updated the line with Intel Kaby Lake processors and newer graphics cards. A 128 GB storage option was added for the base 13-inch model, down from the base 256 GB storage. New symbols were introduced to the control and option keys. On July 12, 2018, Apple updated the Touch Bar models with Intel Coffee Lake quad-core processors in 13-inch models and six-core processors in 15-inch models, updated graphics cards, third-generation butterfly keyboards that introduced new symbols for the control and option keys, Bluetooth 5, T2 SoC Chip, True Tone display technology, and larger-capacity batteries. The 15-inch model can also be configured with up to 4 TB of storage, 32 GB of DDR4 memory and a Core i9 processor. In late November the higher-end 15-inch model could be configured with Radeon Pro Vega graphics. On May 21, 2019, Apple announced updated Touch Bar models with newer processors, with an eight-core Core i9 standard for the higher-end 15-inch model, and an updated keyboard manufactured with "new materials" across the line. On July 9, 2019, Apple updated the 13-inch model with two Thunderbolt ports with newer quad-core eighth-generation processors and Intel Iris Plus graphics, True Tone display technology, and replaced the function keys with the Touch Bar. macOS Catalina added support for Dolby Atmos, Dolby Vision, and HDR10 on 2018 and newer models. macOS Catalina 10.15.2 added support for 6016x3384 output on 15-inch 2018 and newer models to run the Pro Display XDR at full resolution.

The 2019 MacBook Pro was the final model that could run macOS Mojave 10.14, the final macOS version that can run 32-bit applications such as Microsoft Office for Mac 2011.

A report by AppleInsider claimed that the updated "Butterfly" keyboard fails twice as often as previous models, often due to particles stuck beneath the keys. Repairs for stuck keys have been estimated to cost more than $700. In May 2018,
two class action lawsuits were filed against Apple regarding the keyboard problem; one alleged a "constant threat of nonresponsive keys and accompanying keyboard failure" and accusing Apple of not alerting consumers to the problem. In June 2018, Apple announced a Service Program to "service eligible MacBook and MacBook Pro keyboards, free of charge". The 2018 models added a membrane underneath keys to prevent malfunction from dust. As of early 2019, there were reports of problems with the same type of keyboards in the 2018 MacBook Air. In May 2019, Apple modified the keyboard for the fourth time and promised that any MacBook keyboard with butterfly switches would be repaired or replaced free of charge for a period of four years after the date of sale.

The Touch Bar MacBook Pro received mixed reviews. The display, build quality, and audio quality were praised but many complained about the butterfly keyboard; the little-used Touch Bar; and the absence of USB-A ports, HDMI port, and SD card slot.

On May 4, 2020, Apple announced an updated 13-inch model with the Magic Keyboard. The four Thunderbolt port version comes with Ice Lake processors, updated graphics, up to 32 GB of memory and 4 TB of storage, and supports 6K output to run the Pro Display XDR. The two Thunderbolt port version has the same Coffee Lake processors, graphics, and maximum storage and memory as the 2019 two Thunderbolt port models. The 2020 13-inch models also gain 0.02 inches (0.6 mm) in thickness over the 2019 models.

Apple silicon

13-inch with Touch Bar (2020–present) 

On November 10, 2020, Apple introduced a new 13-inch MacBook Pro with two Thunderbolt ports with a brand new Apple M1 processor, directly replacing the previous generation of Intel-based 2020 baseline 13-inch MacBook Pro with two Thunderbolt ports. The M1 13-inch MacBook Pro was released alongside an updated MacBook Air and Mac Mini as the first generation of Macs with Apple's new line of custom ARM-based Apple silicon processors. This MacBook Pro model retains the same form factor/design and added support for Wi-Fi 6, USB4, and 6K output to run the Pro Display XDR, and increased the memory in the base configuration to 8 GB. The supported external displays was reduced to one, as the previous Intel-based models supported two 4K displays. The FaceTime camera remains 720p but Apple advertises an improved image signal processor for higher quality video.

14-inch and 16-inch (2021–present) 

On October 18, 2021, Apple replaced the high-end 13-inch and 16-inch Intel-based MacBook Pros with 14-inch and 16-inch MacBook Pros, now equipped with the new Apple silicon chips, M1 Pro and M1 Max, Apple's second ARM-based chips and their first professional-focused chips. Apple addressed many criticisms of the Touch Bar MacBook Pro by restoring hard function keys in place of the Touch Bar, an HDMI port, an SD card reader, MagSafe charging, and a higher base memory. Other additions include a Liquid Retina XDR display with thinner bezels and an iPhone-like notch, ProMotion variable refresh rate, a 1080p webcam, Wi-Fi 6, 3 Thunderbolt ports, a 6-speaker sound system supporting Dolby Atmos, and support of multiple external displays.

These new models feature a thicker and more-squared design than their Intel-based predecessors. The keyboard features full-sized function keys, with the keyboard set in a "double anodized" black well. The MacBook Pro branding has been removed from the bottom of the display bezel and is engraved on the underside of the chassis instead. The models' appearance has been compared to the Titanium PowerBook G4 produced from 2001 to 2003.

In January 2023, the 14-inch and 16-inch models were updated. The new models come with the Apple M2 Pro and M2 Max, can be configured with up to 96 GB of RAM (up from 64 GB), support HDMI 2.1 that can drive an 8K external display (the 2021 models supported HDMI 2.0), and support faster Wi-Fi 6E. Apple advertises the new 16-inch model with "up to 22 hours" of battery life, which it says is the "longest battery life ever" in a Mac.

Current lineup

Timeline

See also 
 12-inch MacBook
 MacBook Air

Notes

References

External links 

 – official site

Computer-related introductions in 2006
Pro
Business laptops